Toulmin may refer to:

Evelyn Toulmin, Anglo-Argentine cricketer
George Toulmin, a British journalist, newspaper proprietor, and politician
George Hoggart Toulmin (1754–1817), English physician and geological thinker
Harry Toulmin (Unitarian minister), son of Joshua Toulmin; served as president of Transylvania Seminary, Kentucky Secretary of State, and U.S. federal judge in Alabama
Harry Aubrey Toulmin, Sr., an American lawyer
Harry Theophilus Toulmin, a U.S. federal judge
Joshua Toulmin, a British theologian
Joshua Toulmin Smith, a British political theorist, lawyer, and historian
Jude Calvert-Toulmin, a British author, publisher, and photographer
Lucy Toulmin Smith, an Anglo-American antiquarian and librarian
Stephen Toulmin, a British philosopher, author, and educator
Theophilus Toulmin Garrard, an American politician and Civil War Union general
Toulmin Smith, the surname of Lucy and Joshua Toulmin Smith

See also
Toulmin method, a method of reasoning devised by Stephen Toulmin